East Centre (Ward 18) is one of the 23 wards of Glasgow City Council. On its creation in 2007 and in 2012 it returned four council members, using the single transferable vote system. For the 2017 Glasgow City Council election, the boundaries were changed, but four members were still returned.

Boundaries
Located in the east of Glasgow, the core of the ward since 2007 includes Carntyne, Cranhill and Riddrie, with the northern boundary being the M8 motorway). The 2017 changes were substantial: the Dennistoun, Milnbank and Haghill neighbourhoods in the west of the original territory were removed and assigned to a new Dennistoun ward, whereas the neighbourhoods of Barlanark, Budhill, Greenfield, Lightburn and Springboig were added to East Centre from the Baillieston ward. The southern boundary is the North Clyde Line railway.

Councillors

Election Results

2022 Election
2022 Glasgow City Council election

2017 Election
2017 Glasgow City Council election

2012 Election
2012 Glasgow City Council election

2007 Election
2007 Glasgow City Council election

See also
Wards of Glasgow

References

External links
Listed Buildings in East Centre Ward, Glasgow City at British Listed Buildings

Wards of Glasgow